The Ninety-Eighth Wisconsin Legislature was convened on January 3, 2007 and ended on January 5, 2009. The final adjournment for legislative activity had been scheduled for June 11, 2008.

Party summary

Officers

Senate
President of the Senate: Sen. Fred Risser
President pro tempore: Sen. Tim Carpenter
Chief Clerk: Hon. Robert J. Marchant
Sergeant at arms: Hon. Edward Blazel

Assembly 
Speaker of the Assembly: Rep. Michael Huebsch
Speaker pro tempore: Rep. Mark Gottlieb
Chief clerk: Hon. Patrick E. Fuller
Sergeant at arms: Hon. Richard A. Skindrud

Members

Senate
Members of the Wisconsin Senate for the Ninety-ninth Wisconsin Legislature (33):

Assembly
Members of the Assembly for the Ninety-ninth Wisconsin Legislature (99):

References

External links

Wisconsin legislative sessions
2000s in Wisconsin